Ronald Welch (born 26 September 1952) is an English former professional association footballer who played as a midfielder.

References

1952 births
Living people
Footballers from Chesterfield
English footballers
Association football midfielders
Burnley F.C. players
Brighton & Hove Albion F.C. players
Chesterfield F.C. players
English Football League players